Fujinami Station is the name of multiple train stations in Japan:

 Fujinami Station (Wakayama) (藤並駅)
 Fujinami Station (Aichi) (藤浪駅)
 Fujinami Station (Ishikawa) (藤波駅) - closed